Albon-d'Ardèche is a commune in the Ardèche department in the Auvergne-Rhône-Alpes region of southern France.

The inhabitants of the commune are known as Albonnais or Albonnaises

Geography
Albon-d'Ardèche is located some 25 km west of Livron-sur-Drome and about 30 km east of Langogne.  The commune is traversed by the D102 coming east from Mézilhac through the village and continuing east to Saint-Sauveur-de-Montagut.  The D211 also traverses the commune in the south running east from the D122 to Saint-Pierreville. Grand Feouzet in the south of the commune is accessed from this road via country roads.  There is a considerable amount of forest in the commune and a little farming.

The Glueyre river passes through the commune from west to east fed by a number of streams in the commune.  The river passes through the village and continues east to join the Eyrieux river at Saint-Sauveur-de-Montagut.

Localities, villages and areas

 Féouzet (and Grand Féouzet)
 Serrepuy
 La Neuve
 Crouzet
 Ribier
 La Sauzée
 Pouchet
 Rouvier
 Le Priouret
 La Pra
 Rémus
 Le Fay
 La Grangette
 La Combe
 Le Pendey
 Tauzuc

Neighbouring communes and towns

History
The Communes of Albon d'Ardèche and Marcols-les-Eaux formed the village of Marcol until 1912.

Administration

List of Successive Mayors of Albon d'Ardèche

Population

Distribution of Age Groups
The population of the town is older than the departmental average.

Percentage Distribution of Age Groups in Albon-d'Ardèche and Ardèche Department in 2017

Source: INSEE

Gallery

See also
 Communes of the Ardèche department

References

External links

Albon-d'Ardèche official website  
Albon-d'Ardèche on the joint Inforoutes website 
Albon-d'Ardèche on the old National Geographic Institute website 
Albon-d'Ardèche on Géoportail, National Geographic Institute (IGN) website 
Albon on the 1750 Cassini Map

Communes of Ardèche